Elena Osipova may refer to:

 Elena Osipova (archer) (born 1993), Russian archer
 Elena Osipova (sociologist) (1927–2018), Russian philosopher and sociologist
 Elena Tchaikovskaia (born 1939), née Osipova, Russian figure skating coach and choreographer
 Yelena Osipova (Russian activist) (born 1945), Russian artist and activist